Kaiserin-Augusta-Straße is a Berlin U-Bahn station located on the . Opened in 1966 by R. G. Rümmler, it has direct access to a department store.

References

U6 (Berlin U-Bahn) stations
Buildings and structures in Tempelhof-Schöneberg
Railway stations in Germany opened in 1966